Li Shuang (born July 14, 1978 in Siping, Jilin) is a female Chinese field hockey player who competed at the 2004 Summer Olympics.

She finished fourth with the Chinese team in the women's competition. She played all six matches.

External links
 
profile

1978 births
Living people
Chinese female field hockey players
Asian Games medalists in field hockey
Asian Games gold medalists for China
Asian Games bronze medalists for China
Field hockey players at the 1998 Asian Games
Field hockey players at the 2002 Asian Games
Field hockey players at the 2004 Summer Olympics
Field hockey players at the 2006 Asian Games
Field hockey players at the 2008 Summer Olympics
Field hockey players at the 2010 Asian Games
Medalists at the 1998 Asian Games
Medalists at the 2002 Asian Games
Medalists at the 2006 Asian Games
Medalists at the 2008 Summer Olympics
Medalists at the 2010 Asian Games
Olympic field hockey players of China
Olympic medalists in field hockey
Olympic silver medalists for China
People from Siping
Sportspeople from Jilin
20th-century Chinese women
21st-century Chinese women